USS LST-7 was an  of the United States Navy built during World War II. Like many of her class, she was not named and is properly referred to by her hull designation.

Construction 
LST-7 was laid down on 17 July 1942, at Pittsburgh, Pennsylvania, by the Dravo Corporation; launched on 31 October 1942; sponsored by Mrs. Anna Marvin; and commissioned on 2 March 1943.

Service history 
LST-7 was assigned to the Mediterranean Theater and European Theater and participated in the following operations: Allied invasion of Sicily in July 1943; Salerno Landings in September 1943; and the Invasion of Normandy in June 1944.

Final disposition
LST-7 was decommissioned on 21 May 1946, and was struck from the Navy list on 19 June 1946. On 7 October 1947, she was sold to Mr. L. Lewis Green, Jr., of Charleston, South Carolina, for scrapping.

Awards
LST-7 earned three battle star for World War II service.

References

Bibliography

External links

 

 

1942 ships
Ships built in Pittsburgh
LST-1-class tank landing ships of the United States Navy
World War II amphibious warfare vessels of the United States
Ships built by Dravo Corporation